The T. Schreiber Studio is an acting studio located in New York City at 151 West 26th Street.

History
Established in 1969 by Terry Schreiber, the studio was originally run out of a loft on the Upper East Side, holding classes for just a handful of students.

In 1970, the studio got a big boost when its production of The Trip Back Down received favorable reviews, including a rave from then noted New York Times drama critic, Walter Kerr. 

On January 25, 1999, the T. Schreiber Studio was recognized by the Office of the Mayor of the City of New York for "Its dedication to making it possible for New Yorkers to enjoy some of the most talented actors, directors and playwrights. For 30 years T. Schreiber Studio's commitment to the theater arts has made it one of the foremost professional theatre studios and helped make New York City the Theatre Capitol of the World."

Faculty and students
Faculty include or have included, amongst others, Terry Schreiber, Betty Buckley, and Lynn Singer.

Students have included, amongst others, Edward Norton, Anthony Aibel, Maria Bello, James Sayess and Peter Sarsgaard.

References

External links
T. Schreiber Studio's official website.

1969 establishments in New York City
Arts organizations established in 1969
Performing arts education in New York City